Philip Lilienthal may refer to:
 Philip H. Lilienthal (born 1940), American lawyer, camp director, and philanthropist
 Philip N. Lilienthal (1850–1908), American banker and philanthropist